Clarence Thomas (born June 23, 1948) is an American jurist who serves as an associate justice of the Supreme Court of the United States. He was nominated by President George H. W. Bush to succeed Thurgood Marshall and has served since 1991. After Marshall, Thomas is the second African American to serve on the Court and its longest-serving member since Anthony Kennedy's retirement in 2018. Since Stephen Breyer's retirement in 2022, Thomas has been the oldest sitting justice.

Thomas was born in Pin Point, Georgia. After his father abandoned the family, he was raised by his grandfather in a poor Gullah community near Savannah. Growing up as a devout Catholic, Thomas originally intended to be a priest in the Catholic Church but was frustrated over the church's insufficient attempts to combat racism. He abandoned his aspiration of becoming a clergyman to attend the College of the Holy Cross and, later, Yale Law School, where he was influenced by a number of conservative authors, notably Thomas Sowell, who dramatically shifted his worldview from progressive to conservative. Upon graduating, he was appointed as an assistant attorney general in Missouri and later entered private practice there. He became a legislative assistant to U.S. Senator John Danforth in 1979, and was made Assistant Secretary for Civil Rights at the U.S. Department of Education in 1981. President Ronald Reagan appointed Thomas as Chairman of the Equal Employment Opportunity Commission (EEOC) the next year. 

President George H. W. Bush nominated Thomas to the United States Court of Appeals for the District of Columbia Circuit in 1990. He served in that role for 19 months before filling Marshall's seat on the Supreme Court. Thomas's confirmation hearings were bitter and intensely fought, centering on an accusation that he had sexually harassed Anita Hill, a subordinate at the Department of Education and the EEOC. Hill alleged that Thomas made multiple sexual and romantic overtures to her despite her repeatedly telling him to stop. Thomas and his supporters denied the allegation, asserting that Hill and her political supporters had fabricated the accusation to prevent the appointment of a black conservative to the Court. The Senate confirmed Thomas by a vote of 52–48—the narrowest margin in a century.

Since the death of Antonin Scalia, Thomas has been the Court's foremost originalist, stressing the original meaning in interpreting the Constitution. In contrast to Scalia—who had been the only other staunch originalist—he pursues a more classically liberal variety of originalism. Until 2020, Thomas was known for his silence during most oral arguments; he has since begun asking more questions to counsel. Thomas is notable for his majority opinions in Good News Club v. Milford Central School (determining the freedom of religious speech in relation to the First Amendment) and New York State Rifle & Pistol Association, Inc. v. Bruen (affirming the individual right to bear arms outside the home), as well as his dissent in Gonzales v. Raich (arguing that Congress may not criminalize the private cultivation of medical marijuana). He is widely considered the Court's most conservative member.

Early life and education

Childhood

Thomas was born in 1948 in Pin Point, Georgia—a small, predominantly black community near Savannah founded by freedmen after the Civil War. He was the second of three children born to M. C. Thomas, a farm worker, and Leola "Pigeon" Williams, a domestic worker. They were the descendants of slaves, and the family spoke Gullah as a first language. Thomas's earliest known ancestors were slaves named Sandy and Peggy, who were born in the late 18th century and owned by wealthy planter Josiah Wilson of Liberty County, Georgia. Thomas's father left the family when Thomas was two years old. Though Thomas's mother worked hard, she was sometimes paid only pennies per day and struggled to earn enough money to feed the family, and she was sometimes forced to rely on charity. After a house fire left them homeless, Thomas and his younger brother Myers were taken to live in Savannah with his maternal grandparents, Myers and Christine (née Hargrove) Anderson.

Thomas then experienced amenities such as indoor plumbing and regular meals for the first time. Myers Anderson had little formal education but built a thriving fuel oil business that also sold ice. Thomas has called Anderson "the greatest man I have ever known." When Thomas was 10, Anderson started taking the family to help at a farm every day from sunrise to sunset. Anderson believed in hard work and self-reliance, and he counseled the children to "never let the sun catch you in bed." He also impressed upon his grandsons the importance of a good education.

Education

Raised Catholic, Thomas attended the predominantly black St. Pius X High School for two years before transferring to St. John Vianney's Minor Seminary on the Isle of Hope, where he was among few black students. He also briefly attended Conception Seminary College, a Catholic seminary in Missouri. No one in Thomas's family had attended college. Thomas has said that he left the seminary in the aftermath of the assassination of Martin Luther King, Jr. He had overheard another student say after the shooting, "Good. I hope the son of a bitch died," and did not think the church did enough to combat racism.

At a nun's suggestion, Thomas enrolled at the College of the Holy Cross in Worcester, Massachusetts, as a sophomore transfer student. While there, Thomas helped found the Black Student Union. He once joined a walkout of the school after some black students were punished while white students went undisciplined for the same violation. Some of the priests negotiated with the protesting black students to reenter the school. As a student, Thomas attended anti-war marches and witnessed the 1970 Harvard Square riots. He has credited these for his disillusionment with leftist movements and his turn toward conservatism.

Having spoken Gullah as a child, Thomas realized in college that he still sounded unpolished despite having been drilled in grammar at school, so he chose to major in English literature "to conquer the language." At Holy Cross, he was a member of Alpha Sigma Nu and the Purple Key Society. Thomas graduated from Holy Cross in 1971 with an A.B. cum laude in English literature.

Thomas had a series of deferments from the military draft while at Holy Cross. Upon graduation, he was classified 1-A and received a low lottery number, indicating he might be drafted to serve in Vietnam. Thomas failed his medical exam because he had a curvature of the spine and was not drafted.

Legal education

After graduating from Holy Cross, Thomas attended Yale Law School, graduating in 1974 with a Juris Doctor degree ranked in the middle of his class. Thomas has said that the law firms he applied to after graduating from Yale did not take his J.D. seriously, assuming he obtained it because of affirmative action. According to Thomas, the law firms also "asked pointed questions, unsubtly suggesting that they doubted I was as smart as my grades indicated." In his 2007 memoir, Thomas wrote, "I peeled a fifteen-cent sticker off a package of cigars and stuck it on the frame of my law degree to remind myself of the mistake I'd made by going to Yale. I never did change my mind about its value."

Literary influences

In 1975, when Thomas read economist Thomas Sowell's Race and Economics, he found an intellectual foundation for his philosophy. The book criticizes social reform by government and argues for individual action to overcome circumstances and adversity. Ayn Rand's works also influenced him, particularly The Fountainhead, and he later required his staffers to watch the 1949 film version of the novel. Thomas acknowledges "some very strong libertarian leanings", though he does not consider himself a libertarian.

Thomas has said novelist Richard Wright is the most influential writer in his life; Wright's books Native Son and Black Boy "capture[d] a lot of the feelings that I had inside that you learn how to repress." Native Son and Ralph Ellison's Invisible Man are Thomas's two favorite novels.

Spike Lee's films also appeal to Thomas, particularly Do the Right Thing and Malcolm X. Thomas has said he would like to meet Lee.

Career

Early career 

After graduation, Thomas studied for the Missouri bar at Saint Louis University School of Law. He was admitted to the Missouri bar on September 13, 1974. From 1974 to 1977, he was an assistant attorney general of Missouri under state Attorney General John Danforth, a fellow Yale alumnus. Thomas was the only African-American member of Danforth's staff. He worked first in the criminal appeals division of Danforth's office and later in the revenue and taxation division. He has said he considers assistant attorney general the best job he ever had. When Danforth was elected to the U.S. Senate in 1976, Thomas left to become an attorney with Monsanto chemical company in St. Louis.

Thomas moved to Washington, D.C., and again worked for Danforth from 1979 to 1981 as a legislative assistant handling energy issues for the Senate Commerce Committee. Thomas and Danforth had both studied to be ordained, although in different denominations. Danforth championed Thomas for the Supreme Court.

President Ronald Reagan nominated Thomas as assistant secretary of education for the Office for Civil Rights in the U.S. Department of Education on May 1, 1981. Thomas's nomination was received by the Senate on May 28, 1981, and he was confirmed to the position on June 26, succeeding Cynthia Brown. Thomas was succeeded by Harry Singleton. Thomas chaired the EEOC from 1982 to 1990. Journalist Evan Thomas once opined that Thomas was "openly ambitious for higher office" during his tenure at the EEOC. As chairman, he promoted a doctrine of self-reliance and halted the usual EEOC approach of filing class action discrimination lawsuits, instead pursuing acts of individual discrimination. He also asserted in 1984 that black leaders were "watching the destruction of our race" as they "bitch, bitch, bitch" about Reagan instead of working with the Reagan administration to alleviate teenage pregnancy, unemployment and illiteracy.

Federal judge 
On October 30, 1989, President George H. W. Bush nominated Thomas to the United States Court of Appeals for the District of Columbia Circuit, following Robert Bork's departure. This followed Thomas's initial protestations against becoming a judge. Thomas gained the support of other African Americans such as former transportation secretary William Coleman but said that when meeting white Democratic staffers in the United States Senate, he was "struck by how easy it had become for sanctimonious whites to accuse a black man of not caring about civil rights".

Thomas's confirmation hearing was uneventful. The United States Senate confirmed him on March 6, 1990, and he received his commission the same day. He developed warm relationships during his 19 months on the federal court, including with fellow judge Ruth Bader Ginsburg.

Supreme Court nomination and confirmation

Announcement and hearings 
When Associate Justice William Brennan retired from the Supreme Court in July 1990, Thomas was Bush's favorite among the five candidates on his shortlist for the position. But after consulting his advisors, Bush nominated David Souter of the First Circuit Court of Appeals. A year later, Justice Thurgood Marshall, the only African American justice on the Court, announced his retirement, and Bush nominated Thomas to replace him. In announcing his selection on July 1, 1991, Bush called Thomas "best qualified at this time".

U.S. presidents have traditionally submitted potential federal court nominees to the American Bar Association (ABA) for a confidential rating of their judicial temperament, competence and integrity on a three-level scale of well qualified, qualified or unqualified. Adam Liptak of The New York Times noted that the ABA has historically taken generally liberal positions on divisive issues, and studies suggest that candidates nominated by Democratic presidents fare better in the group's ratings than those nominated by Republicans. Anticipating that the ABA would rate Thomas more poorly than they thought he deserved, the White House and Republican senators pressured the ABA for at least the mid-level qualified rating and simultaneously attempted to discredit the ABA as partisan. The ABA did rate Thomas as qualified, although with one of the lowest levels of support for a Supreme Court nominee.

Some of the public statements of Thomas's opponents foreshadowed his confirmation hearings. Liberal interest groups and Republicans in the White House and Senate approached the nomination as a political campaign.

Attorney General Richard Thornburgh had previously warned Bush that replacing Marshall, who was widely revered as a civil rights icon, with any candidate who was not perceived to share Marshall's views would make confirmation difficult. Civil rights and feminist organizations opposed the appointment based partially on Thomas's criticism of affirmative action and suspicions that Thomas might not support Roe v. Wade.

Thomas's formal confirmation hearings began on September 10, 1991. He was reticent when answering senators' questions during the process, recalling what had happened to Robert Bork when Bork expounded on his judicial philosophy during his confirmation hearings four years earlier. Thomas's earlier writings frequently reference the legal theory of natural law; during his confirmation hearings he limited himself to the statement that he regarded natural law as a "philosophical background" to the Constitution.

On September 27, 1991, after extensive debate, the Judiciary Committee voted 13–1 to send Thomas's nomination to the full Senate without recommendation. A motion earlier in the day to give the nomination a favorable recommendation had failed 7–7. Hill's sexual harassment allegations against Thomas became public after the nomination had been reported out from the committee.

Anita Hill allegations 

At the conclusion of the committee's confirmation hearings, and while the Senate was debating whether to give final approval to Thomas's nomination, an FBI interview with Anita Hill was leaked to the press. As a result, on October 8 the final vote was postponed, and the confirmation hearings were reopened. It was only the third time in the Senate's history that such an action was taken and the first since 1925, when Harlan F. Stone's nomination was recommitted to the Judiciary Committee.

Hill was called before the Judiciary Committee and testified that ten years earlier Thomas had subjected her to comments of a sexual nature, which she felt constituted sexual in her words "behavior that is unbefitting an individual who will be a member of the Court." Hill's testimony included lurid details, and some senators questioned her aggressively. Hill accused Thomas of, among other things, making two sexually offensive remarks to her: he compared his own penis to that of Long Dong Silver, a black pornstar, and said he had discovered a pubic hair on his Coca-Cola can.

Thomas was recalled before the committee. He denied the allegations, saying:

Throughout his testimony, Thomas defended his right to privacy. He made it clear that he was not going to put his personal life on display for public consumption, permit the committee (or anyone else) to probe his private life, or describe discussions that he may have had with others about his private life. The committee accepted his right to do so.

Hill was the only person to publicly testify that Thomas had sexually harassed her. Angela Wright, who worked under Thomas at the EEOC before he fired her, decided not to testify. She submitted a written statement alleging that Thomas had pressured her for a date and had made comments about the anatomy of women but said she did not feel his behavior was intimidating, nor did she feel sexually harassed, though she allowed that "[s]ome other women might have." Sukari Hardnett, a former Thomas assistant, wrote to the Senate committee that although Thomas had not harassed her, "If you were young, black, female and reasonably attractive, you knew full well you were being inspected and auditioned as a female."

In addition to Hill and Thomas, the committee heard from several other witnesses over the course of three days, October 11–13, 1991. A former colleague, Nancy Altman, who shared an office with Thomas at the Department of Education, testified that she heard virtually everything Thomas said over the course of two years, and never heard a sexist or offensive comment. Altman did not find it credible that Thomas could have engaged in the conduct Hill alleged without any of the dozens of women he worked with noticing it. Reflecting the skepticism of some committee members, Senator Alan K. Simpson asked why Hill met, dined with, and spoke by phone with Thomas on various occasions after they no longer worked together. In 2007, Thomas wrote My Grandfather's Son: A Memoir, in which he addressed Hill's allegations and the caustic confirmation hearing.

Based on "evidence amassed by investigative journalists over... years", including new corroborative testimony, journalist Corey Robin wrote in a 2019 monograph, "it's since become clear that Thomas lied to the Judiciary Committee when he stated that he never sexually harassed Anita Hill" and that he had subjected her to sexually harassing comments. Robin concurred that Thomas's description of the accusations as a "high-tech lynching" was an authentic reaction and reflected Thomas's sincere belief about the racial dimension of the Judiciary Committee's inquiries.

Senate votes 

On October 15, 1991, after the testimony, the Senate voted to confirm Thomas as an associate justice of the Supreme Court by a 52–48 vote. In all, Thomas received the votes of 41 Republicans and 11 Democrats, while 46 Democrats and two Republicans voted to reject his nomination.

The 99 days during which Thomas's nomination was pending in the Senate was the second-longest of the 16 nominees receiving a final vote since 1975, second only to Bork's of 108 days; the vote was the narrowest margin for approval since 1881, when Stanley Matthews was confirmed 24–23.

Thomas received his commission on October 23 and took the prescribed constitutional and judicial oaths of office, becoming the Court's 106th justice. He was sworn in by Justice Byron White in a ceremony initially scheduled for October 21, which was postponed because of the death of Chief Justice William Rehnquist's wife.

Public perception 
Thomas is associated with the Court's conservative wing. He has rarely given media interviews during his time on the Court. In 2007, he said, "One of the reasons I don't do media interviews is, in the past, the media often has its own script." That same year, Thomas received a $1.5 million advance for his memoir, My Grandfather's Son, which became a bestseller. He was the subject of the 2020 documentary film Created Equal: Clarence Thomas in his Own Words.

Political science scholar Corey Robin and Thomas biographer Scott Douglas Gerber have opined that critics such as Jeffrey Toobin have been unusually vitriolic toward Thomas. Robin has compared the way "Thomas has been dismissed as an intellectual nonentity" to similar insinuations made about Thurgood Marshall, "the only other black Supreme Court justice in American history." Gerber likewise writes,

Other critics have outlined separate reasons, such as liberals' disappointment that Thomas has departed so much from Marshall's jurisprudence. Additional causes for the harsh criticism may be the explosive nature of sexual misconduct allegations, the suspicion among some people that Thomas was not forthright during his confirmation hearings, and the belief that, ironically, Thomas's nomination was a kind of affirmative action akin to the programs that he has criticized as a judge.

In 2006, Thomas had a 48% favorable, 36% unfavorable rating, according to Rasmussen Reports. A YouGov poll conducted in March 2021 found that Thomas was the most popular sitting Supreme Court justice among Republicans, with a 59% approval rating in that category.

Thomas's influence, particularly among conservatives, was perceived to have significantly increased during Donald Trump's presidency, and Trump appointed many of his former clerks to political positions and judgeships. As the Supreme Court became more conservative, Thomas and his legal views became more influential among the Court. This influence increased further by 2022, with Thomas authoring an opinion expanding Second Amendment rights and contributing to the Court's overruling of Roe v. Wade; Thomas also was the most senior associate justice by this time.

Thomas is the spouse of Ginni Thomas, a political activist who in late 2020 described an unknown number of American citizens who she hoped would be "living in barges off GITMO" in accordance with the QAnon-affiliated conspiracy theory that President Biden, his family, and thousands of state and county election officials, administrators, and volunteers orchestrated a vast conspiracy to rig the 2020 elections across thousands of administrative districts or wards. Public perception of the likelihood of such QAnon-style conspiracy theories influencing a justice of the U.S. Supreme Court was widespread enough that President Joe Biden was asked whether Thomas should recuse himself from any January-6-related cases. He replied that the answer was for others to determine, mentioning the congressional investigating committee and the Department of Justice. Under U.S. law to date, each justice of the court is the main and possibly only person who has power over their own recusal.

A petition to impeach Thomas, hosted on MoveOn, had gathered more than 1,245,000 signatures by July 29, 2022, after the United States House Select Committee on the January 6 Attack requested that Ginni Thomas testify about her reported connections to Donald Trump's attempts to overturn the 2020 election.

Judicial philosophy

Conservatism and originalism 
Thomas is often described as an originalist and as a textualist. He is often described as the Court's most conservative member, though others gave Justice Antonin Scalia that designation while they served on the Court together. Scalia and Thomas had similar judicial philosophies, and pundits speculate about the degree to which Scalia found some of Thomas's views implausible.

Thomas's jurisprudence has been compared to that of Justice Hugo Black, who "resisted the tendency to create social policy out of 'whole cloth.'" According to the same critic, Thomas generally declines to engage in judicial lawmaking, viewing the Court's constitutional role as the interpretation of law, rather than making law.

Some critics downplay the significance of originalism in Thomas's jurisprudence and say Thomas applies originalism in his decisions inconsistently. Law professor Jim Ryan and former litigator Doug Kendall have argued that Thomas "will use originalism where it provides support for a politically conservative result" but ignores originalism when "history provides no support" for a conservative ruling. Others have argued that Thomas employs a "pluralistic approach to originalism" in which he relies on a mix of original intent, understanding, and public meaning to guide his judgments. Such critics observe that Thomas's originalism most often seems inconsistent or pluralistic when court decisions intersect issues related to race. Robin, while calling originalism "at best episodic" in Thomas's rulings, says it still plays a significant role in how Thomas envisions the Constitution and "functions as an organizing" narrative for his interpretation.

Voting alignment 
In his early years on the Court, Thomas voted most frequently with Scalia and Chief Justice William Rehnquist. On average, from 1994 to 2004, Scalia and Thomas had an 87% voting alignment, the highest on the court, followed by Ruth Bader Ginsburg and David Souter's (86%). Scalia's and Thomas's agreement rate peaked in 1996, at 98%. By 2004, other pairs of justices were more closely aligned than Scalia and Thomas.

The conventional wisdom that Thomas's votes followed Scalia's is reflected by Linda Greenhouse's observation that Thomas voted with Scalia 91% of the time during October Term 2006, and with Justice John Paul Stevens the least, 36% of the time. Jan Crawford asserts that to some extent, this was also true in the other direction: Scalia often joined Thomas instead of Thomas joining Scalia. Statistics compiled annually by Tom Goldstein of SCOTUSblog demonstrate that Greenhouse's count is methodology-specific, counting non-unanimous cases where Scalia and Thomas voted for the same litigant, regardless of whether they got there by the same reasoning. Goldstein's statistics show that the two agreed in full only 74% of the time and that the frequency of their agreement is not as outstanding as often implied in pieces aimed at lay audiences. For example, in that same term, Souter and Ginsburg voted together 81% of the time by the method of counting that yields a 74% agreement between Thomas and Scalia. By the metric that produces the 91% Scalia/Thomas figure, Ginsburg and Breyer agreed 90% of the time. Roberts and Alito agreed 94% of the time. Robin has called the idea that Thomas followed Scalia's votes a debunked myth.

Crawford wrote in her book on the Supreme Court that Thomas's forceful views moved "moderates like Sandra Day O'Connor further to the left" but frequently attracted votes from Rehnquist and Scalia. Toobin and Mark Tushnet opine that Rehnquist rarely assigned important majority opinions to Thomas because Thomas's views made it difficult for him to persuade a majority to join him.

Number of opinions and frequency in dissent 

From when he joined the Court in 1991 through the end of the 2019 term, Thomas had written 693 opinions, not including opinions relating to orders or the "shadow docket". These 693 opinions consist of 223 majority opinions, 226 concurrences, 214 dissents, and 30 "split" opinions. Thomas has written the majority opinion in a 5–4 case 40 times and the dissenting opinion in an 8–1 case 30 times.

From 1994 to 2004, on average, Thomas was the third-most-frequent dissenter on the Court, behind Stevens and Scalia. Four other justices dissented as frequently in 2007; this number was three in 2006 and one in 2005.

Stare decisis 

Thomas spoke favorably about stare decisis—the principle that the Court is bound by its preceding decisions—during his confirmation hearings, saying, "stare decisis provides continuity to our system, it provides predictability, and in our process of case-by-case decision making, I think it is a very important and critical concept." According to Scalia, Thomas "doesn't believe in stare decisis, period." This assessment is consistent with Thomas's record on the bench: factoring in length of tenure, Thomas urged overruling and joined in overruling precedents more often than any other justice on the Rehnquist Court.

Also according to Scalia, Thomas is more willing to overrule constitutional cases than he was: "If a constitutional line of authority is wrong, he would say let's get it right. I wouldn't do that." Law professor Michael Gerhardt has said that Scalia's characterization of Thomas may be incorrect, given that Thomas has supported leaving a broad spectrum of constitutional decisions intact. Thomas's belief in originalism is strong; he has said, "When faced with a clash of constitutional principle and a line of unreasoned cases wholly divorced from the text, history, and structure of our founding document, we should not hesitate to resolve the tension in favor of the Constitution's original meaning." Thomas believes that an erroneous decision can and should be overturned, no matter how old it is.

In 2005, while assistant professor of law at Notre Dame Law School, Amy Coney Barrett wrote that Thomas supports statutory stare decisis. Her examples included his concurring opinion in Fogerty v. Fantasy.

In Franchise Tax Board of California v. Hyatt (2019), Thomas wrote the 5–4 decision overruling Nevada v. Hall (1979), which said states could be sued in courts of other states. He wrote that stare decisis "is not an inexorable command." Thomas explicitly disavowed the concept of reliance interests as justification for adhering to precedent. In dissent from Franchise Tax Bd. of Cal., Justice Breyer asked what other decisions might eventually be overruled, and suggested Roe v. Wade might be among them. Breyer stated that it is best to leave precedents alone unless they are widely seen as erroneous or become impractical.

In Flowers v. Mississippi (2019), a 7–2 decision, Thomas dissented from the ruling overturning Mississippi resident Curtis Flowers’s death sentence, joined only by Neil Gorsuch, and suggested Batson v. Kentucky, which forbids prosecutors from using race as a factor in making peremptory challenges in jury selection, was wrongly decided and should be overruled. Gorsuch did not join the section of Thomas's opinion suggesting Batson should be overruled.

Commerce Clause 
Thomas has consistently supported narrowing the court's interpretation of the Constitution's Interstate Commerce Clause (often simply called the "Commerce Clause") to limit federal power, though he has broadly interpreted states' sovereign immunity from lawsuits under the clause.

In United States v. Lopez and United States v. Morrison, the Court held that Congress lacked power under the Commerce Clause to regulate non-commercial activities. In these cases, Thomas wrote a separate concurring opinion arguing for his interpretation of the Commerce Clause's original meaning. Subsequently, in Gonzales v. Raich, the Court interpreted the Commerce Clause combined with the Necessary and Proper Clause as empowering the federal government to arrest, prosecute, and imprison patients who used marijuana grown at home for medicinal purposes, even where that is legal under state law. Thomas dissented in Raich, again arguing for the Commerce Clause's original meaning.

Thomas and Scalia rejected the notion of a Dormant Commerce Clause, also known as the "Negative Commerce Clause". That doctrine bars state commercial regulation even if Congress has not yet acted on the matter.

In Lopez, Thomas expressed his view that federal regulation of manufacturing and agriculture is unconstitutional; he sees both as outside the Commerce Clause's scope. He believes federal legislators have overextended the clause, while some of his critics argue that his position on congressional authority would invalidate much of the federal government's contemporary work. According to Thomas, it is not the Court's job to update the Constitution. Proponents of broad national power such as Professor Michael Dorf deny that they are trying to do so; instead, they say they are merely addressing a set of economic facts that did not exist when the Constitution was framed.

Executive power 

Thomas has argued that the executive branch has broad authority under the Constitution and federal statutes. In Hamdi v. Rumsfeld, he was the only justice to agree with the Fourth Circuit that Congress had the power to authorize the president's detention of U.S. citizens who are enemy combatants. Thomas granted the federal government the "strongest presumptions" and said "due process requires nothing more than a good-faith executive determination" to justify the imprisonment of a U.S. citizen.

Thomas was one of three justices to dissent in Hamdan v. Rumsfeld, which held that the military commissions the Bush administration created to try detainees at Guantanamo Bay required explicit congressional authorization and that the commissions conflicted with both the Uniform Code of Military Justice and "at least" Common Article Three of the Geneva Convention. Thomas argued that Hamdan was an illegal combatant and therefore not protected by the Geneva Convention and agreed with Scalia that the Court was "patently erroneous" in its declaration of jurisdiction in this case.

In the Ninth Circuit case East Bay Sanctuary Covenant v. Trump (2018), which placed an injunction on the Trump administration's asylum policy, Thomas dissented from a denial of stay application. The Ninth Circuit imposed an injunction on the Trump administration's policy granting asylum only to refugees entering from a designated port of entry, ruling that it violated the Immigration and Nationality Act of 1952. Ninth Circuit Judge Jay Bybee’s majority opinion concluded that denial of the ability to apply for asylum regardless of entry point is "the hollowest of rights that an alien must be allowed to apply for asylum regardless of whether she arrived through a port of entry if another rule makes her categorically ineligible for asylum based on precisely that fact." Gorsuch, Alito, Kavanaugh also dissented in the decision to deny a stay to the Ninth Circuit's injunction.

Federalism 
Federalism was a central part of the Rehnquist Court's constitutional agenda. Thomas consistently voted for outcomes that promoted state-governmental authority in cases involving federalism-based limits on Congress's enumerated powers. According to law professor Ann Althouse, the court has yet to move toward "the broader, more principled version of federalism propounded by Justice Thomas."

In Foucha v. Louisiana, Thomas dissented from the majority opinion that required the removal from a mental institution of a prisoner who had become sane. The court held that a Louisiana statute violated the Due Process Clause "because it allows an insanity acquittee to be committed to a mental institution until he is able to demonstrate that he is not dangerous to himself and others, even though he does not suffer from any mental illness." Dissenting, Thomas cast the issue as a matter of federalism. "Removing sane insanity acquittees from mental institutions may make eminent sense as a policy matter", he wrote, "but the Due Process Clause does not require the States to conform to the policy preferences of federal judges." In United States v. Comstock, Thomas's dissent argued for the release of a former federal prisoner from civil commitment, again on the basis of federalism. In U.S. Term Limits, Inc. v. Thornton, he wrote a dissent defending term limits on federal House and Senate candidates as a valid exercise of state legislative power.

Federal statutes 
As of 2007, Thomas was the justice most willing to exercise judicial review of federal statutes but among the least likely to overturn state statutes. According to a New York Times editorial, "from 1994 to 2005 ... Justice Thomas voted to overturn federal laws in 34 cases and Justice Scalia in 31, compared with just 15 for Justice Stephen Breyer."

In Northwest Austin Municipal Utility District No. 1 v. Holder, Thomas was the sole dissenter, voting to throw out Section Five of the 1965 Voting Rights Act. Section Five requires states with a history of racial voter discrimination—mostly states from the old South—to gain Justice Department clearance when revising election procedures. Congress had reauthorized Section Five in 2006 for another 25 years, but Thomas said the law was no longer necessary, stating that the rate of black voting in seven Section Five states was higher than the national average. He wrote, "the violence, intimidation and subterfuge that led Congress to pass Section 5 and this court to uphold it no longer remains." He took this position again in Shelby County v. Holder, voting with the majority and concurring with the reasoning that struck down Section Five.

Bill of Rights

First Amendment 
By 2002, Thomas was the justice second-most likely to uphold free speech claims (tied with Souter). He has voted in favor of First Amendment claims in cases involving issues including pornography, campaign contributions, political leafleting, religious speech, and commercial speech.

With respect to the Establishment Clause, Thomas espouses accommodationism. He has made public his belief that all limits on federal campaign contributions are unconstitutional and should be struck down. He voted with the majority in Citizens United v. FEC.

On occasion, Thomas has disagreed with free speech claimants. For example, he dissented in Virginia v. Black, a case that struck down part of a Virginia statute that banned cross burning. Concurring in Morse v. Frederick, he argued that the free speech rights of students in public schools are limited. In Mahanoy Area School District v. B.L.—in which an off-campus high school student was punished by her school for sending a profane message on social media regarding her school, softball team, and cheer team—Thomas was the lone dissenter, siding with the school. He criticized the majority for relying on "vague considerations" and wrote that historically schools could discipline students in situations similar to the case. In Walker v. Texas Division, Sons of Confederate Veterans, he joined the majority opinion that Texas's decision to deny a request for a Confederate Battle Flag specialty license plate was constitutional.

Thomas wrote the decision in Ashcroft v. ACLU, which held that the Child Online Protection Act might be constitutional. The government was enjoined from enforcing it, pending further proceedings in the lower courts. Thomas wrote concurrences in McIntyre v. Ohio Elections Commission, 514 U.S. 334 (1995) and United States v. Playboy Entertainment Group (2000).

In Elk Grove Unified School District v. Newdow, Thomas wrote, "It may well be the case that anything that would violate the incorporated Establishment Clause would actually violate the Free Exercise Clause, further calling into doubt the utility of incorporating the Establishment Clause", and in Cutter v. Wilkinson, he wrote, "I note, however, that a state law that would violate the incorporated Establishment Clause might also violate the Free Exercise Clause."

Thomas has said "it makes little sense to incorporate the Establishment Clause" vis-à-vis the states by the Fourteenth Amendment.

Second Amendment 
Thomas agreed with the judgment in McDonald v. Chicago (2010) that the right to keep and bear arms is applicable to state and local governments, but he wrote a separate concurrence finding that an individual's right to bear arms is fundamental as a privilege of American citizenship under the Privileges or Immunities Clause rather than as a fundamental right under the due process clause. The four justices in the plurality opinion specifically rejected incorporation under the privileges or immunities clause, "declin[ing] to disturb" the holding in the Slaughter-House Cases, which, according to the plurality, had held that the clause applied only to federal matters.

Since 2010, Thomas has dissented from denial of certiorari in several Second Amendment cases. He voted to grant certiorari in Friedman v. City of Highland Park (2015), which upheld bans on certain semi-automatic rifles; Jackson v. San Francisco (2014), which upheld trigger lock ordinances similar to those struck down in Heller; Peruta v. San Diego County (2016), which upheld restrictive concealed carry licensing in California; and Silvester v. Becerra (2017), which upheld waiting periods for firearm purchasers who have already passed background checks and already own firearms. He was joined by Scalia in the first two cases, and by Gorsuch in Peruta.

Thomas dissented from the denial of an application for a stay presented to Chief Justice Roberts in the United States Court of Appeals for the District of Columbia Circuit case Guedes v. Bureau of Alcohol, Tobacco, Firearms, and Explosives (2019), a case challenging the Trump administration's ban on bump stocks. Only Thomas and Gorsuch publicly dissented.

Thomas authored the majority opinion in New York State Rifle & Pistol Association, Inc. v. Bruen (2022), guaranteeing the right of law-abiding citizens to carry firearms in public.

Fourth Amendment 
In cases regarding the Fourth Amendment, which prohibits unreasonable searches and seizures, Thomas often favors police over defendants. For example, his opinion for the Court in Board of Education v. Earls upheld drug testing for students involved in extracurricular activities, and he wrote again for the Court in Samson v. California, permitting random searches on parolees. He dissented in Georgia v. Randolph, which prohibited warrantless searches that one resident approves and the other opposes, arguing that the Court's decision in Coolidge v. New Hampshire controlled the case. In Indianapolis v. Edmond, Thomas described the Court's extant case law as having held that "suspicionless roadblock seizures are constitutionally permissible if conducted according to a plan that limits the discretion of the officers conducting the stops." He expressed doubt that those cases were decided correctly but concluded that since the litigants in the case at bar had not briefed or argued that the earlier cases be overruled, he believed that the Court should assume their validity and rule accordingly. Thomas was in the majority in Kyllo v. United States, which held that the use of thermal imaging technology to probe a suspect's home without a warrant violated the Fourth Amendment.

In cases involving schools, Thomas has advocated greater respect for the doctrine of in loco parentis, which he defines as "parents delegat[ing] to teachers their authority to discipline and maintain order." His dissent in Safford Unified School District v. Redding illustrates his application of this postulate in the Fourth Amendment context. School officials in the Safford case had a reasonable suspicion that 13-year-old Savana Redding was illegally distributing prescription-only drugs. All the justices concurred that it was therefore reasonable for the school officials to search Redding, and the main issue before the Court was only whether the search went too far by becoming a strip search or the like. All the justices except Thomas concluded that the search violated the Fourth Amendment. The majority required a finding of danger or reason to believe drugs were hidden in a student's underwear in order to justify a strip search. Thomas wrote, "It is a mistake for judges to assume the responsibility for deciding which school rules are important enough to allow for invasive searches and which rules are not" and "reasonable suspicion that Redding was in possession of drugs in violation of these policies, therefore, justified a search extending to any area where small pills could be concealed." He added, "[t]here can be no doubt that a parent would have had the authority to conduct the search."

Sixth Amendment 
In Doggett v. United States, the defendant had technically been a fugitive from the time he was indicted in 1980 until his arrest in 1988. The Court held that the delay between indictment and arrest violated Doggett's Sixth Amendment right to a speedy trial, finding that the government had been negligent in pursuing him and that he was unaware of the indictment. Thomas dissented, arguing that the Speedy Trial Clause's purpose was to prevent "'undue and oppressive incarceration' and the 'anxiety and concern accompanying public accusation'" and that the case implicated neither. He cast the case instead as "present[ing] the question [of] whether, independent of these core concerns, the Speedy Trial Clause protects an accused from two additional harms: (1) prejudice to his ability to defend himself caused by the passage of time; and (2) disruption of his life years after the alleged commission of his crime." Thomas dissented from the court's decision to, as he saw it, answer the former in the affirmative. He wrote that dismissing the conviction "invites the Nation's judges to indulge in ad hoc and result-driven second guessing of the government's investigatory efforts. Our Constitution neither contemplates nor tolerates such a role."

In Garza v. Idaho, Thomas and Gorsuch, in dissent, suggested that Gideon v. Wainwright (1963), which required that indigent criminal defendants be provided counsel, was wrongly decided and should be overruled.

Eighth Amendment 
Thomas was among the dissenters in Atkins v. Virginia and Roper v. Simmons, which held that the Eighth Amendment prohibits the application of the death penalty to certain classes of persons. In Kansas v. Marsh, his opinion for the Court indicated a belief that the Constitution affords states broad procedural latitude in imposing the death penalty, provided they remain within the limits of Furman v. Georgia and Gregg v. Georgia, the 1976 case in which the Court reversed its 1972 ban on death sentences if states followed procedural guidelines.

In Hudson v. McMillian, a prisoner had been beaten, sustaining a cracked lip, broken dental plate, loosened teeth, cuts, and bruises. Although these were not "serious injuries", the Court believed, it held that "the use of excessive physical force against a prisoner may constitute cruel and unusual punishment even though the inmate does not suffer serious injury." Dissenting, Thomas wrote, "a use of force that causes only insignificant harm to a prisoner may be immoral, it may be tortious, it may be criminal, and it may even be remediable under other provisions of the Federal Constitution, but it is not 'cruel and unusual punishment'. In concluding to the contrary, the Court today goes far beyond our precedents." Thomas's vote—in one of his first cases after joining the Court—was an early example of his willingness to be the sole dissenter (Scalia later joined the opinion). His opinion was criticized by the seven-member majority, which wrote that, by comparing physical assault to other prison conditions such as poor prison food, it ignored "the concepts of dignity, civilized standards, humanity, and decency that animate the Eighth Amendment". According to historian David Garrow, Thomas's dissent in Hudson was a "classic call for federal judicial restraint, reminiscent of views that were held by Felix Frankfurter and John M. Harlan II a generation earlier, but editorial criticism rained down on him". Thomas later responded to the accusation "that I supported the beating of prisoners in that case. Well, one must either be illiterate or fraught with malice to reach that conclusion ... no honest reading can reach such a conclusion."

In United States v. Bajakajian, Thomas joined with the Court's liberal justices to write the majority opinion declaring a fine unconstitutional under the Eighth Amendment. The fine was for failing to declare more than $300,000 in a suitcase on an international flight. Under a federal statute, (a)(1), the passenger would have had to forfeit the entire amount. Thomas noted that the case required a distinction to be made between civil forfeiture and a fine exacted with the intention of punishing the respondent. He found that the forfeiture in this case was clearly intended as a punishment at least in part, was "grossly disproportional" and violated the Excessive Fines Clause.

Thomas has written that the "Cruel and Unusual Punishment" clause "contains no proportionality principle", meaning that the question whether a sentence should be rejected as "cruel and unusual" depends only on the sentence itself, not on what crime is being punished. He was concurring with the Court's decision to reject a request for review from a petitioner who had been sentenced to 25 years to life in prison under California's "Three-Strikes" law for stealing some golf clubs because the combined value of the clubs made the theft a felony and he had two previous felonies in his criminal record.

Race, equal protection, and affirmative action 
Thomas believes the Equal Protection Clause of the Fourteenth Amendment forbids consideration of race, such as race-based affirmative action or preferential treatment. In Adarand Constructors v. Peña, for example, he wrote, "there is a 'moral [and] constitutional equivalence' between laws designed to subjugate a race and those that distribute benefits on the basis of race in order to foster some current notion of equality. Government cannot make us equal; it can only recognize, respect, and protect us as equal before the law. That [affirmative action] programs may have been motivated, in part, by good intentions cannot provide refuge from the principle that under our Constitution, the government may not make distinctions on the basis of race."

In Gratz v. Bollinger, Thomas wrote, "a State's use of racial discrimination in higher education admissions is categorically prohibited by the Equal Protection Clause." In Parents Involved in Community Schools v. Seattle School District No. 1, Thomas joined the opinion of Chief Justice Roberts, who wrote that "[t]he way to stop discrimination on the basis of race is to stop discriminating on the basis of race." Concurring, Thomas wrote, "if our history has taught us anything, it has taught us to beware of elites bearing racial theories", and charged that the dissent carried "similarities" to the arguments of the segregationist litigants in Brown v. Board of Education.

Likewise, in Grutter v. Bollinger, Thomas approvingly quoted Justice Harlan's Plessy v. Ferguson dissent: "Our Constitution is color-blind, and neither knows nor tolerates classes among citizens." In a concurrence in Missouri v. Jenkins (1995), he wrote that the Missouri District Court "has read our cases to support the theory that black students suffer an unspecified psychological harm from segregation that retards their mental and educational development. This approach not only relies upon questionable social science research rather than constitutional principle, but it also rests on an assumption of black inferiority."

Some legal scholars have called Thomas's views on race and the constitution "idiosyncratic," "pessimistic," or "fatalistic." For example, professors Corey Robin and Stephen F. Smith have characterized Thomas's philosophy as grounded in a form of black nationalism that sees governmental attempts to address racism as either futile or counterproductive. That view contrasts with the belief that laws should be race-neutral because racial discrimination is no longer a serious problem in the United States.

Abortion and family planning 
Thomas has contended that the Constitution does not address abortion. In Planned Parenthood v. Casey (1992), the Court reaffirmed Roe v. Wade. Thomas and Justice Byron White joined the dissenting opinions of Rehnquist and Scalia. Rehnquist wrote, "[w]e believe Roe was wrongly decided, and that it can and should be overruled consistently with our traditional approach to stare decisis in constitutional cases." Scalia's opinion concluded that the right to obtain an abortion is not "a liberty protected by the Constitution of the United States." "[T]he Constitution says absolutely nothing about it," Scalia wrote, "and [ ] the longstanding traditions of American society have permitted it to be legally proscribed."

In Stenberg v. Carhart (2000), the Court struck down a state ban on partial-birth abortion, concluding that it failed Casey's "undue burden" test. Thomas dissented, writing, "Although a State may permit abortion, nothing in the Constitution dictates that a State must do so." He went on to criticize the reasoning of the Casey and Stenberg majorities: "The majority's insistence on a health exception is a fig leaf barely covering its hostility to any abortion regulation by the States—a hostility that Casey purported to reject."

In Gonzales v. Carhart (2007), the Court rejected a facial challenge to a federal ban on partial-birth abortion. Concurring, Thomas asserted that the court's abortion jurisprudence had no basis in the Constitution but that the court had accurately applied that jurisprudence in rejecting the challenge. He added that the Court was not deciding the question of whether Congress had the power to outlaw partial-birth abortions: "[W]hether the Act constitutes a permissible exercise of Congress's power under the Commerce Clause is not before the Court [in this case] ... the parties did not raise or brief that issue; it is outside the question presented; and the lower courts did not address it."

In December 2018, Thomas dissented when the Court voted not to hear cases brought by Louisiana and Kansas to deny Medicaid funding to Planned Parenthood. Alito and Gorsuch joined Thomas's dissent, arguing that the Court was "abdicating its judicial duty."

In February 2019, Thomas joined three of the Court's other conservative justices in voting to reject a stay to temporarily block a law restricting abortion in Louisiana. The law that the court temporarily stayed, in a 5–4 decision, would have required that doctors performing abortions have admitting privileges in a hospital.

In Box v. Planned Parenthood of Indiana and Kentucky, Inc. (2019), a per curiam decision upholding the provision of Indiana's abortion restriction regarding fetal remains disposal on rational basis scrutiny and upholding the lower court rulings striking down the provision banning race, sex, and disability, Thomas wrote a concurring opinion comparing abortion and birth control to eugenics, which was practiced in the U.S. in the early 20th century and by the Nazi government in Germany in the 1930s and 1940s, and comparing Box to Buck v. Bell (1927), which upheld a forced sterilization law regarding people with mental disabilities. In his opinion, Thomas quoted Margaret Sanger's support for contraception as a form of personal reproductive control that she considered superior to "the horrors of abortion and infanticide" (Sanger's words). His opinion referred several times to historian/journalist Adam Cohen's book Imbeciles: The Supreme Court, American Eugenics, and the Sterilization of Carrie Buck; shortly afterward, Cohen published a sharply worded criticism saying that Thomas had misinterpreted his book and misunderstood the history of the eugenics movement. In Box, only Thomas, Sonia Sotomayor, and Ginsburg publicly registered their votes. Ginsburg and Sotomayor concurred in part and dissented in part, stating they would have upheld the lower court decision on striking down the race, sex, and disability ban as well as the lower court decision striking down the fetal remains disposal provision.

In a concurring opinion in Dobbs v. Jackson Women's Health Organization (2022), Thomas wrote that "any substantive due process decision is 'demonstrably erroneous'", and argued that the Supreme Court should go beyond Roe vs. Wade and reconsider other substantive due process precedents, including those established in Griswold v. Connecticut (1965), Lawrence v. Texas (2003) and Obergefell v. Hodges (2015). The overturning of these previous decisions would enable states to limit access to contraception, criminalize sodomy, and criminalize same-sex marriage, respectively.

LGBTQ rights 
In Jacobson v. United States (1992), Thomas agreed with the majority that the federal government had unlawfully entrapped a gay man when it enticed him into buying a magazine with nude pictures of underage boys.

In Romer v. Evans (1996), Thomas joined Scalia's dissenting opinion arguing that Amendment Two to the Colorado State Constitution did not violate the Equal Protection Clause. The Colorado amendment forbade any judicial, legislative, or executive action designed to protect persons from discrimination based on "homosexual, lesbian, or bisexual orientation, conduct, practices or relationships."

In Lawrence v. Texas (2003), Thomas issued a one-page dissent in which he called the Texas statute prohibiting sodomy "uncommonly silly", a phrase originally used by Justice Potter Stewart. He then said that if he were a member of the Texas legislature he would vote to repeal the law, as it was not a worthwhile use of "law enforcement resources" to police private sexual behavior. But Thomas opined that the Constitution does not contain a right to privacy and therefore did not vote to strike the statute down. He saw the issue as a matter for states to decide for themselves.

In Bostock v. Clayton County, Georgia (2020), Thomas joined Alito and Kavanaugh in dissenting from the decision that Title VII of the Civil Rights Act of 1964 protects employees against discrimination based on sexual orientation or gender identity. (Thomas and Alito wrote a dissent together, and Kavanaugh wrote separately.) The 6–3 ruling's majority consisted of two Republican-appointed justices, Roberts and Gorsuch, along with four Democratic-appointed justices: Ginsburg, Breyer, Sotomayor, and Kagan.

In October 2020, Thomas joined the other justices in denying an appeal from Kim Davis, a county clerk who refused to give marriage licenses to same-sex couples, but wrote a separate opinion reiterating his dissent from Obergefell v. Hodges and expressing his belief that it was wrongly decided. In July 2021, he was one of three justices, with Gorsuch and Alito, who voted to hear an appeal from a Washington florist who had refused service to a same-sex couple based on her religious beliefs against same-sex marriage. In November 2021, Thomas dissented from the majority of justices in a 6-3 vote to reject an appeal from Mercy San Juan Medical Center, a hospital affiliated with the Roman Catholic Church, which had sought to deny a hysterectomy to a transgender patient on religious grounds. Alito and Gorsuch also dissented, and the vote to reject the appeal left in place a lower court ruling in the patient's favor.

Approach to oral arguments 
Thomas is well known for his reticence during oral argument. After asking a question during a death penalty case on February 22, 2006, Thomas did not ask another question from the bench for more than ten years, until February 29, 2016, about a response to a question regarding whether persons convicted of misdemeanor domestic violence should be barred permanently from firearm possession. This moment has been seen as an homage to Justice Scalia, who had died a few weeks earlier. Thomas also had a nearly seven-year streak of not speaking at all during oral arguments, finally breaking that silence on January 14, 2013, when he, a Yale Law graduate, was understood to have joked either that a law degree from Yale or from Harvard may be proof of incompetence. Thomas took a more active role in questioning when the Supreme Court shifted to holding teleconferenced arguments in May 2020 during the COVID-19 pandemic; before that, he spoke in 32 of the roughly 2,400 arguments since 1991. Since the court resumed in-person oral arguments at the beginning of the 2021 term, Thomas has usually been the first justice to ask a question to counsel.

Thomas has given many reasons for his silence, including self-consciousness about how he speaks, a preference for listening to those arguing the case, and difficulty getting in a word. His speaking and listening habits may have been influenced by his Gullah upbringing, during which his English was relatively unpolished.

In 2000, Thomas told a group of high school students, "if you wait long enough, someone will ask your question." Although he rarely speaks from the bench, he has acknowledged that sometimes during oral arguments, he will pass notes to Breyer who then asks questions on Thomas's behalf.

In November 2007, Thomas told an audience at Hillsdale College, "My colleagues should shut up!" He later explained, "I don't think that for judging, and for what we are doing, all those questions are necessary." According to Amber Porter of ABC News, one of the most notable instances in which Thomas asked a question was in 2002 during oral arguments for Virginia v. Black, when he expressed concern to Michael Dreeben, who had been speaking on behalf of the U.S. Department of Justice, that he was "actually understating the symbolism ... and the effect of ... the burning cross" and its use as a symbol of the "reign of terror" of "100 years of lynching and activity in the South by the Knights of Camellia ... and the Ku Klux Klan".

Thomas is not the first quiet justice. In the 1970s and 1980s, Justices William J. Brennan, Marshall, and Harry Blackmun generally were quiet. But Thomas's silence stood out in the 1990s as the other eight justices engaged in active questioning. The New York Times's Supreme Court correspondent Adam Liptak has called it a "pity" that Thomas does not ask questions, saying that he has a "distinctive legal philosophy and a background entirely different from that of any other justice" and that those he asked in the 2001 and 2002 terms were "mostly good questions, brisk and pointed." Conversely, Jeffrey Toobin, writing in The New Yorker, called Thomas's silence "disgraceful" behavior that had "gone from curious to bizarre to downright embarrassing, for himself and for the institution he represents."

In a 2017 paper in the Northwestern University Law Review, RonNell Andersen Jones and Aaron L. Nielson argue that while asking few questions, "in many ways, [Thomas] is a model questioner", exhibiting habits such as following up on colleagues' inquiries and showing respect to attorneys. Later in 2020, Jones and Nielson posited that Thomas asked questions more frequently when the Supreme Court held oral arguments by teleconferencing during the COVID-19 pandemic because he found the new format more palatable. In the teleconferencing format, justices took turns answering questions and spoke when called on by Chief Justice Roberts. Thomas "has questions that he thinks are valuable", Jones and Nielson concluded, but dislikes the "free-for-all" of typical questioning during oral arguments.

Personal life

Family 
In 1971, Thomas married Kathy Grace Ambush. The couple had one child, Jamal Adeen (b. 1973, New Haven, Connecticut), Thomas's sole offspring. Thomas and his first wife separated in 1981 and divorced in 1984. In 1987, Thomas married Virginia Lamp, a lobbyist and aide to Republican Congressman Dick Armey. In 1997, they took in Thomas's six-year-old great-nephew, Mark Martin Jr., who had lived with his mother in Savannah public housing.  Since 1999, Thomas and his wife have traveled across the U.S. in a motorcoach between Court terms.

Virginia "Ginni" Thomas has remained active in conservative politics, serving as a consultant to The Heritage Foundation and as founder and president of Liberty Central. In 2011, she stepped down from Liberty Central to open a conservative lobbying firm, touting her "experience and connections", meeting with newly elected Republican representatives and calling herself an "ambassador to the Tea Party". Also in 2011, 74 Democratic members of the House of Representatives wrote that Justice Thomas should recuse himself on cases regarding the Affordable Care Act because of "appearance of a conflict of interest" based on his wife's work.

In January 2011, the liberal advocacy group Common Cause reported that between 2003 and 2007, Thomas failed to disclose $686,589 in income his wife earned from The Heritage Foundation, instead reporting "none" where "spousal noninvestment income" would be reported on his Supreme Court financial disclosure forms. The next week, Thomas said the disclosure of his wife's income had been "inadvertently omitted due to a misunderstanding of the filing instructions". He amended reports going back to 1989.

The Washington Post reported in February 2021 that Ginni Thomas apologized to a group of Thomas's former clerks on the email listserv "Thomas Clerk World" for her role in contributing to a rift relating to "pro-Trump postings and former Thomas clerk John Eastman, who spoke at the rally and represented Trump in some of his failed lawsuits filed to overturn the election results." In March 2022, texts between Ginni Thomas and Trump's chief of staff Mark Meadows from 2020 were turned over to the Select Committee on the January 6 Attack. The texts show Ginni Thomas repeatedly urging Meadows to overturn the election results and repeating conspiracy theories about ballot fraud. In response, 24 Democratic members of the House of Representatives and the Senate demanded that Thomas recuse himself from cases related to efforts to overturn the results of the 2020 presidential election and the January 6 attack at the U.S. Capitol on the grounds that Ginni Thomas's involvement in such efforts raises questions about his impartiality. An April 2022 Quinnipiac poll found that 52% of Americans agree that in light of Ginni Thomas's texts about overturning the results of the 2020 presidential election, Thomas should recuse himself from related cases.

Religion 
Clarence Thomas was reconciled to the Catholic Church in the mid-1990s. In his autobiography, he criticized the church for failing to grapple with racism in the 1960s during the civil rights movement, saying it was not so "adamant about ending racism then as it is about ending abortion now". As of 2021, Thomas is one of 14 practicing Catholic justices in the Court's history and one of six currently serving (along with Alito, Kavanaugh, Roberts, Sotomayor and Barrett).

Alleged harassment 
In 2016, Moira Smith, a lawyer, said that Thomas groped her at a dinner party in 1999, when she was a Truman Foundation scholar. Thomas called the allegation "preposterous".

Honors and recognition
In 2012, Thomas received an honorary degree from the College of the Holy Cross, his alma mater.

Writings

See also 

 List of African-American jurists
 List of African-American federal judges
 List of justices of the Supreme Court of the United States
 List of law clerks of the Supreme Court of the United States (Seat 10)
 List of United States Supreme Court justices by time in office
 United States Supreme Court cases during the Rehnquist Court
 United States Supreme Court cases during the Roberts Court
 Black conservatism in the United States

References

Works cited

Further reading

External links 

 
 
 Issue positions and quotes at On the Issues
 
 Cornell Law School Biography of Clarence Thomas
 Oyez, Official Supreme Court media, Clarence Thomas biography
 Supreme Court Associate Justice Nomination Hearings on Clarence Thomas in September and October 1991 United States Government Publishing Office

|-

|-

|-

1948 births
20th-century American judges
21st-century American judges
African-American Catholics
African-American judges
African-American non-fiction writers
American non-fiction writers
American libertarians
American memoirists
Catholics from Georgia (U.S. state)
Catholics from Virginia
Catholic libertarians
Chairs of the Equal Employment Opportunity Commission
College of the Holy Cross alumni
George Washington University Law School faculty
Federalist Society members
Gullah
Judges of the United States Court of Appeals for the D.C. Circuit
Justices of the Supreme Court of the United States
Current Justices of the Supreme Court of the United States
Lawyers from St. Louis
Living people
Missouri lawyers
Missouri Republicans
Monsanto employees
People from Chatham County, Georgia
People from McLean, Virginia
People from Savannah, Georgia
United States court of appeals judges appointed by George H. W. Bush
United States federal judges appointed by George H. W. Bush
Virginia Republicans
Writers from Washington, D.C.
Yale Law School alumni
Black conservatism in the United States